Sunnmøre Arbeideravis (The Sunnmøre Workers Gazette) was a newspaper published by A-pressen in Ålesund, Norway from 1931 to 1985. It became a daily paper in 1934. The newspaper was known by the abbreviation SA.

Sunnmøre Arbeideravis was a continuation of Møre Social-Demokrat (1921–1931). Publication of Sunnmøre Arbeideravis was suspended during the German occupation, from May 1, 1940 until May 8, 1945. During its first years, the editing was overseen by an editorial committee, which consisted of Gustav Melsæther, Olav Istad, Anton L. Alvestad, and Angell Benjaminsen in 1934. When the newspaper became a daily in 1934, a permanent editor was appointed.

After the paper was discontinued, some of its staff launched the free newspaper Nytt i uka.

List of editors
 Erling Tråholt 1934–1940
 Harald Thoresen 1945
 Alf Salvesen 1945–1946
 Arnvid Hasund 1946–1948
 Karl Pape 1948–1951
 Reinhardt Rørvik 1951–1953
 Simen Kr. Hangaard 1953–1960
 Odd Ragnar Torvik 1960–1964
 Magne Nedregård 1964–1968
 Johannes Skeide Larsen 1968–1971
 Torstein Dreyer 1972–1977
 Steinar Slagstad 1977–1982
 Jan-Petter Albertsen 1982–1985

References

Defunct newspapers published in Norway
Norwegian-language newspapers
Mass media in Møre og Romsdal
Mass media in Ålesund
Publications established in 1931
Publications disestablished in 1985
1931 establishments in Norway
1985 disestablishments in Norway